Sir Richard Christopher Sharples,  (6 August 1916 – 10 March 1973) was a British politician and Governor of Bermuda who was shot dead by assassins linked to a small militant Bermudian Black Power group called the Black Beret Cadre. The former army major, who had been a Cabinet Minister, resigned his seat to take up the position of Governor of Bermuda in late 1972. His murder resulted in the last executions conducted under British rule.

Career
Sharples passed out from the Royal Military Academy, Sandhurst, in 1936 and was commissioned into the Welsh Guards. During the Second World War he served in France and Italy. He rose to the rank of Lieutenant colonel and left the army in 1953. He married Pamela Newall in 1946; they had two sons and two daughters. The family greatly enjoyed yachting, and this was the basis of a close friendship with Edward Heath, later prime minister. Sharples was elected Conservative Member of Parliament for Sutton and Cheam in a 1954 byelection. After the 1970 general election, he served as Minister of State at the Home Office, before resigning his seat in 1972 to take up the position of Governor of Bermuda. He was assassinated in 1973 by a faction associating itself with the Black Power movement.

His widow was subsequently made a life peer as Baroness Sharples.

Assassination

Sharples was killed outside Bermuda's Government House on 10 March 1973. An informal dinner party for a small group of guests had just concluded, when he decided to go for a walk with his Great Dane, Horsa, and his aide-de-camp, Captain Hugh Sayers of the Welsh Guards. The two men and dog were ambushed and gunned down outside the Governor's residence.

The Governor's coffin was borne by officers of the Bermuda Regiment, and Sayers' by a party from the Welsh Guards. The ship's Royal Marines detachment provided an honour guard on the flight deck. HMS Sirius conveyed the bodies from Hamilton to St. George's, where they were interred at St. Peter's Church. After the assassination HMS Sirius provided enhanced security for Commodore Cameron Rusby, the Senior Naval Officer West Indies (SNOWI) who was stationed on the island. A detachment of Royal Marines (subsequently replaced by soldiers from the Parachute Regiment) was posted to the Dockyard to guard SNOWI.

Sharples was buried in the graveyard at St Peter's Church in St George's on 16 March 1973, six days after his assassination, with Captain Sayers and Great Dane, Horsa.

Elements of the British Army's airborne forces, which were training at Warwick Camp with the Bermuda Regiment at the time of the murders, were called in to assist the civil authorities. The 23 Parachute Field Ambulance, 1 Parachute Logistic Regiment and the band of the 1st Battalion, The Parachute Regiment subsequently provided protection for government buildings, officials and dignitaries as well as assisting the Bermuda Police.

Police launched a massive manhunt and investigation. Seven months later an armed man named Erskine Durrant "Buck" Burrows was arrested. He confessed to shooting dead Sharples and Sayers. At his trial he was also convicted of murdering the Bermuda Police commissioner George Duckett on 9 September 1972 and killing the co-owner and the bookkeeper of a supermarket in April 1973. He was sentenced to death.

In his confession Burrows wrote: 

A co-accused named Larry Tacklyn was acquitted of assassinating Sharples and Sayers but was convicted of killing Victor Rego and Mark Doe at the Shopping Centre supermarket in April 1973. Unlike Burrows, who did not care whether he was to be executed, Tacklyn expected to get a "last minute" reprieve.

Both murderers remained in Casemates Prison while the appeals process for Tacklyn was brought before the Privy Council in London. During this time, it was reported that Tacklyn passed the time playing table tennis, while Burrows took a virtual vow of silence, only communicating his thoughts and requests on scraps of paper.

Both men were hanged on 2 December 1977 at Casemates Prison. A moratorium on hanging was then in effect, and, although others had been sentenced to death in the intervening years, no one had been executed in Bermuda since the Second World War. Burrows and Tacklyn would be the last people to be executed under British rule anywhere in the world.

Three days of rioting followed the executions. During the riots, the Bermuda Regiment proved too small to fulfil its role (which was considered by Major General Glyn Gilbert, the highest ranking Bermudian in the British Army, in his review of the regiment, leading to its increase from 400 soldiers to a full battalion of 750). As a consequence, at the request of the Bermuda Government, soldiers of the 1st Battalion the Royal Regiment of Fusiliers were flown in as reinforcements in the aftermath of the riots. The cost of the damages was estimated to be $2 million.

Honours and decorations
On 20 December 1940, Sharples was awarded the Military Cross (MC) for "gallant conduct in action with the enemy". In 1945, he was mentioned in dispatches for services in Italy. In 1946, he was awarded the Silver Star, the United States Armed Forces third-highest military decoration for valor in combat. He was appointed an Officer of the Order of the British Empire (OBE) in the 1953 Coronation Honours List.

In 1972, Sharples was knighted as a Knight Commander of the Order of St Michael and St George following his appointment as Governor of Bermuda.

Notes

Sources
The Ottawa Citizen, 11 March 1973,**as first reported.**
'The Black Panthers: Their Dangerous Bermudian Legacy''
The Black Panthers: Their Dangerous Bermudian Legacy, Mel Ayton 2006.

External links

Funeral of Assassinated Governor, Sir Richard Sharples, AP Archive, 17 March 1973
BBC News story from 1973
Bernews: Details of assassination of Sir Richard, and subsequent conviction

1916 births
1973 deaths
Assassinated British politicians
Assassinated English politicians
British Army personnel of World War II
Conservative Party (UK) MPs for English constituencies
Deaths by firearm in Bermuda
Governors of Bermuda
Graduates of the Royal Military College, Sandhurst
Knights Commander of the Order of St Michael and St George
Ministers in the Macmillan and Douglas-Home governments, 1957–1964
Officers of the Order of the British Empire
People murdered in Bermuda
Politicians awarded knighthoods
Racially motivated violence against white Europeans
Recipients of the Military Cross
Foreign recipients of the Silver Star
Spouses of life peers
UK MPs 1951–1955
UK MPs 1955–1959
UK MPs 1959–1964
UK MPs 1964–1966
UK MPs 1966–1970
UK MPs 1970–1974
Welsh Guards officers